Sheldon Lee Glashow (born December 5, 1932) is a Nobel Prize-winning American theoretical physicist. He is the Metcalf Professor of Mathematics and Physics at Boston University and Eugene Higgins Professor of Physics, Emeritus, at Harvard University, and is a member of the Board of Sponsors for the Bulletin of the Atomic Scientists.

Birth and education
Sheldon Glashow was born on December 5, 1932 in New York City, to Jewish immigrants from Russia, Bella (née Rubin) and Lewis Gluchovsky, a plumber. He graduated from Bronx High School of Science in 1950. Glashow was in the same graduating class as Steven Weinberg, whose own research, independent of Glashow's, would result in Glashow,  Weinberg, and Abdus Salam sharing the 1979 Nobel Prize in Physics (see below).  Glashow received a Bachelor of Arts degree from Cornell University in 1954 and a PhD degree in physics from Harvard University in 1959 under Nobel-laureate physicist Julian Schwinger. Afterwards, Glashow became a NSF fellow at NORDITA and met Murray Gell-Mann, who convinced him to become a research fellow at the California Institute of Technology. Glashow then became an assistant professor at Stanford University before joining the University of California, Berkeley where he was an associate professor from 1962 to 1966. He joined the Harvard physics department as a professor in 1966, and was named Eugene Higgins Professor of Physics in 1979; he became emeritus in 2000.  Glashow has been a visiting scientist at CERN, and professor at Aix-Marseille University, MIT, Brookhaven Laboratory, Texas A&M, the University of Houston, and Boston University.

Research
In 1961, Glashow extended electroweak unification models due to Schwinger by including a short range neutral current, the Z0. The resulting symmetry structure that Glashow proposed, SU(2) × U(1), forms the basis of the accepted theory of the electroweak interactions. For this discovery, Glashow along with Steven Weinberg and Abdus Salam, was awarded the 1979 Nobel Prize in Physics.

In collaboration with James Bjorken, Glashow was the first to predict a fourth quark, the charm quark, in 1964. This was at a time when 4 leptons had been discovered but only 3 quarks proposed. The development of their work in 1970, the GIM mechanism showed that the two quark pairs: (d.s), (u,c), would largely cancel out flavor changing neutral currents, which  had been observed experimentally at far lower levels than theoretically predicted on the basis of 3 quarks only. The prediction of the charm quark also removed a technical disaster for any quantum field theory with unequal numbers of quarks and leptons — an anomaly — where classical field theory symmetries fail to carry over into the quantum theory.

In 1973, Glashow and Howard Georgi proposed the first grand unified theory. They discovered how to fit the gauge forces in the standard model into an SU(5) group, and the quarks and leptons into two simple representations. Their theory qualitatively predicted the general pattern of coupling constant running, with plausible assumptions, it gave rough mass ratio values between third generation leptons and quarks, and it was the first indication that the law of Baryon number is inexact, that the proton is unstable. This work was the foundation for all future unifying work.

Glashow shared the 1977 J. Robert Oppenheimer Memorial Prize with Feza Gürsey.

Criticism of superstring theory
Glashow is a skeptic of superstring theory due to its lack of experimentally testable predictions. He had campaigned to keep string theorists out of the Harvard physics department, though the campaign failed. About ten minutes into "String's the Thing", the second episode of The Elegant Universe TV series, he describes superstring theory as a discipline distinct from physics, saying "...you may call it a tumor, if you will...".

Personal life
Glashow is married to Joan Shirley Alexander. They have four children. Lynn Margulis was Joan's sister, making Carl Sagan his former brother-in-law. Daniel Kleitman, who was another doctoral student of Julian Schwinger, is also his brother-in-law, through Joan's other sister, Sharon.

In 2003, he was one of 22 Nobel Laureates who signed the Humanist Manifesto. Glashow has described himself as a "practising atheist" and a Democrat.

Glashow is one of the 20 American recipients of the Nobel Prize in Physics to sign a letter addressed to President George W. Bush in May 2008, urging him to "reverse the damage done to basic science research in the Fiscal Year 2008 Omnibus Appropriations Bill" by requesting additional emergency funding for the Department of Energy’s Office of Science, the National Science Foundation, and the National Institute of Standards and Technology.

Works
The Charm of Physics (1991) 
From Alchemy to Quarks: The Study of Physics as a Liberal Art (1994) 
Interactions: A Journey Through the Mind of a Particle Physicist and the Matter of this World (1988) 
First Workshop on Grand Unification: New England Center, University of New Hampshire, April 10–12, 1980 edited with Paul H. Frampton and Asim Yildiz (1980) 
Third Workshop on Grand Unification, University of North Carolina, Chapel Hill, April 15–17, 1982 edited with Paul H. Frampton and Hendrik van Dam (1982) 
"Desperately Seeking Superstrings?" with Paul Ginsparg in Riffing on Strings: Creative Writing Inspired by String Theory (2008)

Awards and honors
 J. Robert Oppenheimer Memorial Prize (1977)
 Nobel Prize in Physics (1979)
 Golden Plate Award of the American Academy of Achievement (1980)
Member of the American Philosophical Society (2002)

See also
Neutral current
Tadpole
Weak hypercharge
List of Jewish Nobel laureates

References
Notes

External links

 
  including the Nobel Lecture, December 8, 1979 Towards a Unified Theory – Threads in a Tapestry
 Sheldon Lee Glashow on www.nobel-winners.com
 Interview with Glashow on Superstrings
 Contributions to the theory of the unified weak and electromagnetic interaction between elementary particles, including inter alia the prediction of the weak neutral current.
 Sheldon Glashow Boston University Physics Department
 Sheldon Glashow Photos
 Interview with Glashow About Contemporary Physics and Winning the Nobel Prize 
 
 

1932 births
Living people
Nobel laureates in Physics
American Nobel laureates
Members of the United States National Academy of Sciences
Foreign Members of the Russian Academy of Sciences
Jewish American atheists
American humanists
21st-century American physicists
New York (state) Democrats
Boston University faculty
The Bronx High School of Science alumni
Cornell University alumni
Harvard Graduate School of Arts and Sciences alumni
Harvard University faculty
Jewish humanists
Jewish American physicists
American people of Russian-Jewish descent
Theoretical physicists
Particle physicists
People associated with CERN
Scientists from New York (state)
Members of the American Philosophical Society